Robert Speight Munro (born 1963) is a Church of England bishop. Since 2023, he has been Bishop of Ebbsfleet, the second provincial episcopal visitor for conservative evangelical members and parishes of the church.

Early life and education
Munro was born in 1963 in Manchester, England. He was raised as an atheist and converted to Christianity through the youth ministry of St. Mary's Cheadle. Munro received a degree in maths at the University of Bristol. After university, he moved to London to study in the ministry training scheme at All Souls Langham Place, then known as All Souls College of Applied Theology. While at All Souls, Munro taught part-time at All Souls School. He returned to Manchester for teacher training at the University of Manchester and taught maths and physical education in Hazel Grove.

After a call to ordained ministry, Munro trained at Oak Hill Theological College and was ordained a priest in 1994. He later received a doctorate from Reformed Theological Seminary in the United States.

Ordained ministry
Munro first served at St John's Church, Hartford, in the Diocese of Chester. In 1997, he became rector of St Wilfrid's Church, Davenham, and in 2003 he returned to St. Mary's Cheadle with St. Cuthbert's as rector. In addition to his service in parish ministry, Munro held several positions in church leadership, including: chairman of the House of Clergy in the Diocese of Chester; an elected member of the Church of England's General Synod from 2005 to 2022; a member of the Dioceses’ Commission; rural dean for Cheadle; and a council member of the Latimer Trust, the Church of England Evangelical Council and Church Society. As a leader of the Fellowship of Word and Spirit (FWS), Munro supported the 2018 merger of FWS and Reform into Church Society to unite English evangelicals.

Episcopacy
In September 2022, Munro was announced as the next Bishop of Ebbsfleet, taking over the portfolio of alternative episcopal oversight held by retired Bishop of Maidstone Rod Thomas. On 2 February 2023, Munro was consecrated a bishop by Justin Welby at Canterbury Cathedral during the same service as Jane Mainwaring and Martin Gainsborough. In deference to Munro's complementarian convictions, the women bishops present refrained from the laying on of hands for Munro, and Welby was only assisted by two other male bishops as co-consecrators (Mark Tanner, Bishop of Chester, and Jonathan Gibbs, Bishop of Rochester).

At the time of Munro's consecration, nearly 150 parishes had passed resolutions requesting alternative episcopal oversight from the Bishop of Maidstone or his successor.

Views
Munro came into office as the General Synod was discussing Anglican bishops' approval (through the Living in Love and Faith process) of same-sex blessings in the Church of England and revisiting the restrictions imposed on gay clergy in same-sex marriages or civil partnerships. Munro commented that the General Synod debate "could threaten to break our unity on the doctrine of marriage, redefine our sanctity with respect to holiness and sexual activity, undermine our catholicity having little obvious regard for the wider Anglican Communion or beyond, and jeopardis[e] our apostolicity with respect to the clear teaching of Scripture. . . . Our received doctrine of marriage, in accordance with Scripture, is that '. . . the union of one man and one woman marriage is in its nature a union permanent and lifelong, for better for worse, till death them do part, of one man with one woman, to the exclusion of all others on either side" (Canon B30), and that includes understanding that 'sexual intercourse, as an expression of faithful intimacy, properly belongs within marriage exclusively' (1999 House of Bishops teaching document Marriage: A Teaching Document). Any move away from this understanding will have serious consequences for our Anglican communion and our mission. It is a serious concern that some recent public pronouncements appear to be at variance with this."

Personal life
Munro is married to Sarah; they have three adult children.

See also

References

External links
 

Living people
Bishops of Ebbsfleet
British evangelicals
Alumni of Oak Hill College
Alumni of the University of Bristol
Alumni of the University of Manchester
Reformed Theological Seminary alumni
21st-century Church of England bishops
Evangelical Anglican bishops
1963 births